Anwar Jamal (born 15 August 1961) is an Indian documentary filmmaker, based in New Delhi. He has been awarded the National Film Award on several occasions and had made critically acclaimed feature, short and documentary films a wide array of social, political and cultural themes. He has served as jury in many international film festivals including National Film Award Jury.

He is most noted for his feature film, Swaraaj – The Little Republic (2002), which he also wrote, produced and directed, on the theme of women's empowerment and the politics of water in rural India.

Early life and education
Anwar grew up in Bareilly, western Uttar Pradesh. He came to Delhi to pursue his interests in arts, literature, theatre, and later cinema. While supporting himself for his Masters in Hindi literature through freelance journalism, he got actively involved with amateur theatre.

He joined the AJK, Mass Communication Research Centre at Jamia Millia Islamia, on the invitation of its founder Chairperson, the late AJ Kidwai, and came close to the world-renowned documentary filmmaker James Beveridge.

Career
While studying, he assisted Anand Patwardhan, a well-known documentary filmmaker on three films, In Memory of Friends, In the Name of God, and Father, Son and Holy War. Thereafter he made his first independent documentary film, My Name is Sister, on nurses in Delhi.
 
His first few short films, made along with Sehjo Singh, were made for Doordarshan (National Television) on the subject of the Deorala Sati incident and the phenomenon of child marriages.  Anwar made his first independent documentary on the question of development and big dams, The Call of Bhagirathi. This documentary featured in the Indian Panorama, and won the National Film Award for Best Investigative Film in 1992.

He has also won two more National Awards for co-producing documentaries on the issue of land rights, directed by Sehjo Singh. Anwar also directed Zinda Itihaas, a serial on living cultural legends like B.C. Sanyal, Zohra Sehgal and Fida Husain Narsi for Doordarshan. He made a short film, 'of life and love', for permanent display at the International Museum of Red Cross and Red Crescent in Geneva, Switzerland.

He worked as the India director (with Sehjo Singh) for Orcades, a series of socio-political stories on French Television in 1989. Mad Mundo, a web-based television series, supported by Arte, on the subject of migration of IT professionals in June 2000 and an hour-long documentary on Indian call centres, made for the Australian Broadcasting Corporation. He has also worked with ARD South Asia wing of German Television on Indian news stories.

In 2002, he made a feature film on the experiences of women in grassroots democratic institutions, titled Swaraaj (The Little Republic), produced by the Institute of Social Sciences. This film was selected for the Indian Panorama at the International Film Festival of India in 2002. It premiered at the World Film Festival in Montreal and travelled to numerous major festivals around the world.
 
He served as a National Film Awards Jury member in 2004 and as an International Jury member for competition films in the Black Night International Film Festival , Tallinn, Estonia in December 2004.

and in the 9th Dhaka International Film Festival in January 2006. More recently, he directed an acclaimed series of short fiction films titled Vanishing Daughters, Uska Aana and Teesra Raasta. He also co-edited a bilingual compilation of essays, Hollywood Bollywood: The Politics of Crossover Films, published by Vani Prakashan.

Anwar's served as Executive Producer of Sikandar (2009), a Hindi feature film produced by the Big Pictures.  The film was shot almost entirely in Kashmir. In 2008, he made the independent documentary, Anwar – Dream of a Dark Night on a fellowship From Prasar Bharati and Public Service Broadcasting Trust. He followed that up in 2009 with Harvest of Grief, an investigative film about of the

agrarian crisis in Punjab and its impact on agricultural families. It was produced by the NGO Ekatra. Jamal received the I&B ministry's Visioning India PSBT 2010 fellowship to make a documentary film on the life and culture of Old Delhi. The film, titled Dil Ki Basti Mein, He recently completed a series of 10 short films promoting heritage conservation for the National Mission on Monuments and Antiquities.

Anwar's feature-length fiction film as director is currently in development. Anwar's work has been screened in more than 200 film festivals around the world. In 2010, he served on the feature film jury of the Roshd International Film Festival in Iran, and at Abu Dhabi Film Festival in 2011.

2012 to 2013 he was the Director City pulse institute of film and television

2013 to 2014 he was an adviser to the Doordarshan Directorate-General for the national broadcaster's Urdu channel. During his tenure he handled the commissioning and quality control of 3000 hours of programming .

He is a member of the English books selection committee of Raja Rammohun Roy Library Foundation Kolkata .

Personal life
He is married and lives in Delhi.

Awards 
 1992: Bhagirathi Ki Pukaar (Call of the Bhagirathi) – National Film Award for Best Investigative Film (Director and Producer)
1994: The Women Betrayed – National Film Award for Best Non-Fiction Film on Social Issues (Producer)
 1996: Sona Maati – National Film Award – Special Jury Prize (Producer)
 1996: Sona Maati – Golden Lotus in the Mumbai International Film Festival
 1998: Kol Tales, International Jury Prize, Mumbai International Film Festival
2003: Swaraaj – The Little Republic – received the Golden Prize in IRIB – International Film Festival, Isfahan, Iran (Producer and Director)
 2003: Swaraaj – National Award for Best Feature Film on Social Issues
2004: Swaraaj – Audience Favorite Award in Palm Springs International Film Festival (California, USA) 2004
2004 Swaraaj – Netpac (critic) award Best Director Award at Dhaka International Film Festival
2010 Anwar – Dream of a Dark Night —International jury mention at Mumbai International Film Festival
2010: Harvest of Grief has received an award certificate in 2010 Los Angeles Reel Film Festival.

References

External links
 
 Harvest of Grief, a film by anwar jamal
 Harvest of Grief-trailor, a docu on Punjab (excerpts)

Indian documentary filmmakers
1961 births
Living people
People from Bareilly
Jamia Millia Islamia alumni
Film producers from Uttar Pradesh
Directors who won the Best Film on Other Social Issues National Film Award